Ludwigia sedoides, commonly known as mosaic flower and false loosestrife, is a herbaceous perennial plant of the family Onagraceae. It has yellow flowers that bloom from June to August. Native to Brazil and Venezuela, its habitat includes wet, swampy localities.

It may be invasive in some areas.

Distributions  
The majority of Ludwigia sedioides are found in subtropical America. Mosaic plant is native to Central America and South America, primarily Venezuela, Panama, Columbia, and Brazil. Due to its rapid growth, efficient mode of reproduction, and aggressive nature, it has been identified as a potentially invasive plant in Sri Lanka. In the future, it might actually pose a threat to Sri Lanka's Biodiversity.

Morphology 

It is an aquatic herbaceous shrub. It is found in standing pools of water with leaves floating on the surface, or growing in very swampy wet soils. The stems of this plant are reddish and brittle. Leaves are diamond-shaped with toothed margins, radiate outwards to form mosaic-like rosettes. The edges of central and older leaves turn bright red when the plant is grown under bright light or sunlight. Leaf rosettes are fully extended during daytime with gaps in between leaves. At night, the rosettes contract such that the leaves overlap one another. This plant is suitable for ponds or containers with  depth. The plant needs to be rooted in the substrate below the water surface. Genus epithet 'Ludwigia' is named after German botanist and professor of medicine, Christian Gottlieb Ludwig (1709–1773). Ludwig corresponded with Carl Linnaeus (father of modern botanical taxonomy) about plant classifications, and Linnaeus dedicated the genus 'Ludwigia''' in honor of Ludwig. Species epithet 'sedoides' means 'resembling sedum', a reference to the leaves which resemble those of certain Sedum'' species in terms of appearance and color changes under strong light.

Flowers and fruits 

The flowers are bright yellow, cup-shaped, solitary, produced in leaf axils from June to August in native habitats. Fruits are explosive capsules.

Usage 

Ludwigia sedioides is an ornamental plant. Hence, apart from its natural habitat, it finds its uses in personal (artificial) ponds and aquariums. Though use in the aquarium is a bit complicated as the need for sunlight and nutrient matters. To summarize, the uses include Riverine, Container Planting, Aquarium / Aquascape, Pond / Lake / River.

References

External resources

https://web.archive.org/web/20050116163139/http://www.horticopia.com/hortpix/html/pc3456.htm

sedoides
Flora of Brazil
Flora of Venezuela
Taxa named by Aimé Bonpland
Taxa named by Alexander von Humboldt